Corallanidae is a family of crustaceans belonging to the order Isopoda.

Genera:
 Alcirona Hansen, 1890
 Argathona Stebbing, 1905
 Corallana Dana, 1853
 Corilana Kossman, 1880
 Excorallana Stebbing, 1904
 Lanocira Hansen, 1890
 Tachaea Schioedte & Meinert, 1879

References

Isopoda